Johan Hansing (10 October 1888 Narva – 24 July 1941 Sverdlovsk Oblast) was an Estonian lawyer, stage actor, playwright, and politician. He was a member of the Estonian National Assembly and elected Mayor of Narva in 1940.

References

1888 births
1941 deaths
Politicians from Narva
People from Yamburgsky Uyezd
Members of the Estonian National Assembly
Mayors of Narva
20th-century Estonian lawyers
Estonian male stage actors
20th-century Estonian male actors
Estonian dramatists and playwrights
Estonian people who died in Soviet detention
People who died in the Gulag